2000 Watts is the second studio album by American singer-songwriter Tyrese. It was released by RCA Records on May 22, 2001 in the United States.

The album features the singles: "I Like Them Girls", "What Am I Gonna Do" and "Just a Baby Boy", which was also featured on the soundtrack to the 2001 film, Baby Boy. 2000 Wattss cover features the Watts Towers.

The album received generally positive reviews. The album debuted at number ten on the US Billboard 200 selling 91,000 copies in its first week, making it Tyrese's first top 10 album. It also debuted at number four on the US Top R&B/Hip-Hop Albums chart. The album was certified gold by the Recording Industry Association of America (RIAA).

Singles
The album's first single, "I Like Them Girls", was released as the album's lead single on March 20, 2001. The single peaked at number 48 on the US Billboard Hot 100 on the chart dated June 9, 2001, becoming the album's most successful single. The album's second single, "What Am I Gonna Do" was released on March 22, 2001. The second single peaked at number 71 on the chart dated October 6, 2001. The album's third single, "Just a Baby Boy" was released on June 19, 2001. The third single peaked at number 90 on the chart dated July 21, 2001.

Critical reception

2000 Watts was met with generally positive reviews. At Metacritic, the album received an average score of 70, based on five reviews.

Cheo Tyehimba of Entertainment Weekly praised Tyrese's sophomore album. He stated that "If most artists experience a sophomore slump, someone forgot to tell Tyrese." He also said "what distinguishes 2000 Watts is its pure pop appeal." Tyehimba gave the album a B+ rating.

Commercial performance
2000 Watts debuted at number ten on the US Billboard 200 chart, selling 91,000 copies in its first week. This became Tyrese's first US top-ten debut on the chart. The album also debuted at number four on the US Top R&B/Hip-Hop Albums chart. The album also spent a total of 24 weeks on the chart. On August 14, 2001, the album was certified gold by the Recording Industry Association of America (RIAA) for sales of over 500,000 copies in the United States.

Track listing
Credits adapted from the album's liner notes.

Charts

Weekly charts

Year-end charts

Certifications

References

External links

2001 albums
Albums produced by Tim & Bob
Albums produced by Battlecat (producer)
Albums produced by Bryan-Michael Cox
Albums produced by Rodney Jerkins
Albums produced by the Underdogs (production team)
Albums produced by Jermaine Dupri
Tyrese Gibson albums
RCA Records albums
Albums produced by Babyface (musician)
Albums produced by Tricky Stewart
Albums produced by Harvey Mason Jr.
Pop albums by American artists